Lafayette station is an Amtrak station in Lafayette, Indiana, served by the Cardinal. The current station facility was established in 1994. The Amtrak train previously stopped in the middle of the city's 5th Street, near the former Monon Railroad depot. The station building was moved to its current location from the southeast corner of 2nd and South streets. It is a Romanesque Revival style depot built in 1902 by the Lake Erie and Western Railroad and Cleveland, Cincinnati, Chicago and St. Louis Railway, as the Big Four Depot. The station was listed on the National Register of Historic Places in 2003.

Significance
The building is an example of early twentieth century commercial architecture. It is one of two such structures in Indiana.  It became part of the New York Central System, serving passengers through Lafayette between Cincinnati and Chicago. Lafayette was a major stop on this main artery of transportation for the NYC. Several trains operated through the station in earlier years of Amtrak, examples being the Floridian, James Whitcomb Riley and the Kentucky Cardinal.

References

External links

Lafayette Amtrak Station (USA Rail Guide – Train Web)

Amtrak stations in Indiana
National Register of Historic Places in Tippecanoe County, Indiana
Railway stations in the United States opened in 1902
Former New York Central Railroad stations
Railway stations on the National Register of Historic Places in Indiana
Romanesque Revival architecture in Indiana
Buildings and structures in Lafayette, Indiana
Transportation buildings and structures in Tippecanoe County, Indiana
1902 establishments in Indiana